The Patna–Purna Express is an Express train belonging to South Central Railway zone that runs between  and  in India. It is currently being operated with 17609/17610 train numbers on a weekly basis.

Service

The 17609/Patna–Purna Express has an average speed of 54 km/hr and covers 1734 km in 32h 4m. The 17610/Purna–Patna Express has an average speed of 54 km/hr and covers 1734 km in 32h 20m.

Route and halts 

The important halts of the train are:

Coach composition

The train has standard ICF rakes with a max speed of 110 kmph. The train consists of 12 coaches:

 1 AC II Tier
 1 AC III Tier
 5 Sleeper coaches
 1 Pantry car
 2 General Unreserved
 2 Seating cum Luggage Rake

Traction

Both trains are hauled by a Moula Ali Loco Shed based WDM-3A diesel locomotive from Patna to Purna and vice versa.

See also 

 Patna Junction railway station
 Purna Junction railway station

Notes

References

External links 

 17609/Patna–Purna Express India Rail Info
 17610/Purna–Patna Express India Rail Info

Transport in Patna
Express trains in India
Rail transport in Bihar
Rail transport in Uttar Pradesh
Rail transport in Madhya Pradesh
Rail transport in Telangana
Rail transport in Maharashtra
Railway services introduced in 2007